Hold On Tight is the only full-length studio album by American rock band Hey Monday.

Production
Hold On Tight was recorded at Fresh Kills in New York City from June 1 to August 3, 2008, with producers S*A*M and Sluggo. Sean Gould served engineer, and recorded guitars with Mike Gentile, while Steve Shebby handled bass recording. Instrumentation on "Candles" was recorded at Abbey Road Studios by Clifford Carter and Peter Cobbin, with assistance from Lewis James. Stephen Harris mixed the album at The Cottage in Killham, UK, before it was mastered by Scott Hull at Scott Hull Mastering in New York City.

Composition
All the songs featured on the album were co-written and produced by: S*A*M & Sluggo, who have worked with many other artists in the past, most notably Gym Class Heroes, Katy Perry and The Academy Is....

Hey Monday's lead singer, Cassadee Pope, explained when the band were writing the songs for the record, they wanted to create something that people could really enjoy and dance to, while still putting their hearts into the songs. Pope states "I feel that in the lyrics of the songs I’ve written for this album, I really was able to do this & the songs really show the diversity I feel I possess."

Release
Hold On Tight was released on October 7, 2008. In October and November, the band supported the Academy Is... on their headlining tour of the US. In December, the band supported All Time Low on their Christma-Hanu-Kwanza tour in the US. On April 2, 2009, a music video was released for "How You Love Me Now". In April and May, the band supported Fall Out Boy on the Believers Never Die Tour Part Deux in the US. The band appeared at The Bamboozle festival in early May. Between mid-October and early December, the band went on a US tour alongside All Time Low, We the Kings and the Friday Night Boys.

Reception

Hold On Tight made headway in the Top Heatseekers chart peaking at number 11. By October 2009, the album's sales stood at 64,000. Critical response to the album was overall positive. Andrew Leahey of AllMusic guide gave the album a favorable review, stating, "There's certainly some filler here, particularly toward the album's conclusion, but Hold On Tight is still stacked with enough T.G.I.F. nuggets to make it an endearing, engaging debut."

Cleveland.com ranked "Homecoming" at number 96 on their list of the top 100 pop-punk songs.

Track listing
Writing credits per booklet.

Charts

Personnel
Personnel per booklet.

Hey Monday
 Cassadee Pope – lead vocals
 Mike Gentile – guitar
 Alex Lipshaw – guitar
 Michael "Jersey" Moriarty – bass
 Elliot James – drums

Additional musicians
 Joseph Pepper – additional guitars (track 9)
 Will Pugh – additional vocals (track 5)
 Sam Hollander – programming
 Dave Katz – programming
 Rob Mathes – strings arranger, conductor
 Isobel Griffiths – strings contracted
 Perry Montague-Mason – concertmaster
 Warren Zalinski – 2nd violin leader
 Peter Lale – violin leader
 Anthony Pleeth – leader

Production and design
 S*A*M and Sluggo – producer
 Sean Gould – engineer, guitars recording
 Mike Gentile – guitars recording
 Steve Shebby – bass recording
 Clifford Carter – piano recording (track 5)
 Peter Cobbin – recording
 Lewis Jones – assistant
 Stephen Harris – mixing
 Scott Hull – mastering
 Bret Disend – executive producer
 Matt Govaere – art direction, design
 Bill Sitzmann – photographer

References
 Citations

Sources

 

2008 debut albums
Albums produced by S*A*M and Sluggo
Columbia Records albums
Hey Monday albums
Decaydance Records albums